The third season of the Albanian reality talent show The Voice Kids Albania began airing on January 18, 2019 and ended on April 19, 2019 on Top Channel, being broadcast on a weekly basis.

Miriam Cani and Aleksandër & Renis Gjoka returned for their second season as coaches, with Arilena Ara replacing Eneda Tarifa as a new coach. Dojna Mema was returning for her second season in the show but this time as a Main Host, replacing Ledion Liço. Flori Gjini was the V-Reporter and he hosted in the live shows the V-Room in YouTube and Facebook, replacing Dojna Mema. The Vocal Coaches were Kamela Islamaj (Team Miriam), Kejsi Tola (Team Gjoka) and Genti Myftaraj (Team Arilena).

Altea Ali from Team Gjoka won this season and she earned a scholarship at the Woodrow Wilson.

Format
The age limit in this season being 6–14 years old.

Pre-Auditions

The show began staging producers' audition days in June 2018 across the Albania and Kosovo.

Episodes

Epilogue
Epilogue (Epilog) is a reunion show that aired one week after the Final of The Voice Kids Albania 3 on April 26, 2019 on Top Channel. The host was Dojna Mema.

Teams
Colour key:

Blind auditions
The open auditions application for the third series closed in June 2018, with the age limit being 6–14 years old. The show began staging producers' audition days in June 2018 across the Albania and Kosovo, with the blind auditions beginning filming on December 16, 2018 and ended on January 6, 2019 in studio of Top Channel in Tirana.

Colour key

Episode 1 (18 January)
The series premiered on 18 January in Top Channel.

Episode 2 (25 January)
The second episode aired on 25 January in Top Channel.

Episode 3 (1 February)
The third episode aired on 1 February in Top Channel.

Episode 4 (8 February)
The fourth episode aired on 8 February in Top Channel.

Episode 5 (15 February)
The fifth episode aired on 15 February in Top Channel.

Episode 6 (22 February)
The sixth episode aired on 22 February in Top Channel.

Battle Rounds
Colour key

Live Shows
Color key

Week 1 (March 22) 
The first live show aired on March 22, 2019 in Top Channel. All artists from Team Miriam sang in the first live show.
 Theme: Films and TV shows
 Opening: Team Miriam ("Walking on Sunshine")

Week 2 (March 29) 
The second live show aired on March 29, 2019 in Top Channel. All artists from Team Gjoka sang in the second live show.
 Theme: 1980s in music
 Opening: Team Gjoka ("We Are the World")

Week 3 (April 5) 
The third live show aired on April 5, 2019 in Top Channel. All artists from Team Arilena sang in the third live show.
 Theme: Top Songs
 Opening: Team Arilena ("Earth Song"/"They Don't Care About Us")

Week 4: Semi - Final (April 12) 
The Semi-Final aired on April 12, 2019 in Top Channel.

Week 5: Final (April 19) 
The Final aired on April 19, 2019 in Top Channel.
 Opening: Finalist's, Coaches and Vocal Coaches ("Radio Ga Ga")

Round 1

Round 2

Elimination chart

Overall
Color key 
Artist's info

Result details

Team
Color key 
Artist's info

Result details

References

External links

Kids 3
2019 Albanian television seasons